{{Infobox ice hockey player
| name = Duane Dennis
| image = 
| caption =
| image_size = 230px
 played_for = AHLPrince Edward Island SenatorsCape Breton OilersECHLWheeling Thunderbirds
| position = Left Wing
| shoots = Left
| height_ft = 6
| height_in = 0
| weight_lb = 187
| birth_date = 
| birth_place = Vernon, British Columbia, Canada
| draft = Undrafted
| career_start = 1994
| career_end = 2003
}}Duane Dennis''' (born February 6, 1969) is a Canadian former professional ice hockey player.

Dennis attended the Acadia University where he played with the Acadia Axemen men's ice hockey team. For his outstanding play during the 1993–94 season, Dennis was named the CIS Player of the year and was awarded the Senator Joseph A. Sullivan Trophy.

Career statistics

Awards and honours

References

External links

1969 births
Living people
Canadian ice hockey left wingers
Cape Breton Oilers players
Ice hockey people from British Columbia
Sportspeople from Vernon, British Columbia
Prince Edward Island Senators players
Wheeling Thunderbirds players
Tampa Bay Tritons players
EHC Neuwied players
Kaufbeurer Adler players
ERC Selb players
HC Thurgau players
SC Riessersee players
Vernon Lakers players